Leptostylopsis is a genus of longhorn beetles of the subfamily Lamiinae.

Selected species

Species List
These 36 species belong to the genus Leptostylopsis:

 Leptostylopsis albofasciatus (Fisher, 1926) i c g
 Leptostylopsis albosignatus (Fisher, 1935) i
 Leptostylopsis annulipes (Fisher, 1942) c g
 Leptostylopsis antillarum (Fisher, 1925) i c g
 Leptostylopsis argentatus (Jacquelin du Val in Sagra, 1857) i c g b
 Leptostylopsis atromaculatus (Fisher, 1926) c g
 Leptostylopsis basifulvus Lingafelter & Micheli, 2009 c g
 Leptostylopsis bidentatus (Fabricius, 1775) c g
 Leptostylopsis caliginosus Lingafelter & Micheli, 2009 c g
 Leptostylopsis chlorescens Lingafelter & Micheli, 2009 c g
 Leptostylopsis cristatus (Fisher, 1925) c g
 Leptostylopsis duvali (Fisher, 1926) c g
 Leptostylopsis guanica Micheli & Micheli, 2004 c g
 Leptostylopsis gundlachi (Fisher, 1925) i c g
 Leptostylopsis humerofulvus Lingafelter & Micheli, 2009 c g
 Leptostylopsis incrassatus (Klug, 1829) c g
 Leptostylopsis jamaicensis (Gahan, 1895) c g
 Leptostylopsis latus Chemsak & Feller, 1988 c g
 Leptostylopsis longicornis (Fisher, 1926) i c g
 Leptostylopsis luteus Dillon, 1956 i c g
 Leptostylopsis martinicensis Villiers, 1980 c g
 Leptostylopsis milleri (Fisher, 1932) c g
 Leptostylopsis monin Micheli & Micheli, 2004 c g
 Leptostylopsis monticola (Fisher, 1935) c g
 Leptostylopsis oakleyi (Fisher, 1935) i
 Leptostylopsis ornatus (Fisher, 1928) c g
 Leptostylopsis perfasciatus Lingafelter & Micheli, 2009 c g
 Leptostylopsis planidorsus (LeConte, 1873) i c g b
 Leptostylopsis poeyi (Fisher, 1925) c g
 Leptostylopsis puntacanaensis Lingafelter & Micheli, 2009 c g
 Leptostylopsis smithi (Gahan, 1895) c g
 Leptostylopsis terraecolor (Horn, 1880) i c g b
 Leptostylopsis testaceus (Frölich, 1792) c g
 Leptostylopsis thomasi Lingafelter & Micheli, 2009 c g
 Leptostylopsis viridicomus (Fisher, 1942) c g
 Leptostylopsis yukiyu Micheli & Micheli, 2004 c g

Data sources: i = ITIS, c = Catalogue of Life, g = GBIF, b = Bugguide.net

References

External links
The genus Leptostylopsis of Hispaniola

Acanthocinini